The women's 1 metre springboard competition at 2013 World Aquatics Championships was held on July 21 with the preliminary round in the afternoon and the final on July 23 in the afternoon session.

Results
The preliminary round was held on July 21 at 14:00 and the final on July 23 at 14:00.

Green denotes finalists

References

Women's 1 m springboard